Thomas William Parrott (April 10, 1868 – January 1, 1932), nicknamed "Tacky Tom", was a professional baseball player. He was a right-handed pitcher over parts of four seasons (1893–1896) with the Chicago Colts, Cincinnati Reds, and St. Louis Browns. For his career, he compiled a 39–48 record in 115 appearances, with a 5.33 earned run average and 166 strikeouts.

As a hitter, Parrott posted a .303 batting average (299-for-986) with 40 doubles, 26 triples, 15 home runs, and 163 runs batted in. He also played 131 games in the outfield and 35 games in the infield.

Parrott was born in Portland, Oregon, in 1868 and died in Dundee, Oregon, at the age of 63. He grew up outside of Sherwood, Oregon. His brother, Walter "Jiggs" Parrott, also played Major League Baseball.

See also
 List of Major League Baseball players to hit for the cycle
 List of Major League Baseball annual saves leaders

Further reading

External links
, or Retrosheet

1868 births
1932 deaths
Major League Baseball pitchers
Baseball players from Portland, Oregon
Chicago Colts players
Cincinnati Reds players
St. Louis Browns (NL) players
Portland (minor league baseball) players
Sacramento Senators players
Portland Gladiators players
Phillipsburg Burgers players
Seattle Hustlers players
Tacoma Daisies players
Birmingham Grays players
Birmingham Blues players
Pensacola (minor league baseball) players
Minneapolis Millers (baseball) players
St. Paul Saints (Western League) players
Detroit Tigers (Western League) players
Wheeling Stogies players
Denver Grizzlies (baseball) players
Pueblo Indians players
Nashville Vols players
San Francisco (minor league baseball) players
Milwaukee Brewers (minor league) players
Portland Green Gages players
Salt Lake City Elders players
Monroe Hill Citys players
Little Rock Travelers players
Atlanta Crackers players
Greenville Cotton Pickers players
Meridian Ribboners players
San Antonio Bronchos players
Galveston Sand Crabs players
Houston Buffaloes players
19th-century baseball players
People from Sherwood, Oregon